Jackson Creek is a  long 3rd order tributary to the Uwharrie River in Randolph County, North Carolina.

Course
Jackson Creek rises on the Plummer Creek divide about 3 miles east of Silver Valley, North Carolina.  Jackson Creek then flows southeasterly to join the Uwharrie River about 1.5 miles northeast of Farmer, North Carolina.

Watershed
Jackson Creek drains  of area, receives about 46.5 in/year of precipitation, has a wetness index of 362.78 and is about 64% forested.

See also
List of rivers of North Carolina

References

Rivers of North Carolina
Rivers of Randolph County, North Carolina